O is the fifteenth letter of the modern Latin alphabet.

O may also refer to:

Letters 
 Օ օ, (Unicode: U+0555, U+0585) a letter in the Armenian alphabet
 Ο ο, Omicron, (Greek), a letter in the Greek alphabet
 O (Cyrillic), a letter of the Cyrillic alphabet
 O (kana), a romanization of the kana (お and オ) in Japanese writing
 ㅇ, a consonant in Hangul, the Korean alphabet
 ဝ, a consonant  in Burmese script
 /o/, close-mid back rounded vowel in the International Phonetic Alphabet
Vo (letter)

Arts and entertainment

Film and television
 O (film), 2001 film starring Josh Hartnett, Mekhi Phifer and Julia Stiles

Literature
 O: A Presidential Novel, anonymous novel published in 2011
 O, fictional planet that is the setting of several short stories by science fiction author Ursula K. Le Guin
 O, fictional character from the French erotic novel Story of O
 "O" Is for Outlaw, the fifteenth novel in Sue Grafton's "Alphabet mystery" series, published in 1999

Media and publications
 O, The Oprah Magazine, magazine founded by Oprah Winfrey
 «O», an international fetish magazine

Music
 "O (Oh!)", 1920 by Ted Lewis, 1953 by Pee Wee Hunt
 O (A.C. Acoustics album), 2002
 O (Damien Rice album), 2002
 O (Eiko Shimamiya album), 2006
 O (Omarion album), 2005
 "O" (Omarion song), the title song
 o (Tilly and the Wall album), 2008
 O, 2002 album by Zone
 "O", a 2014 song by Coldplay from Ghost Stories
 "o", a song by iamamiwhoami
 "O!", a song by the American band Bright from The Albatross Guest House, 1997
 O (musician), American musician

Sports
 O (gesture), a gesture used to show support for the sports teams of the University of Oregon
 Baltimore Orioles, an American Major League Baseball team, among whose common nicknames are "O's" and "The O's"

Others
 O (Cirque du Soleil), show at the Bellagio hotel and casino in Las Vegas, Nevada

Companies
 Essie's Original Hot Dog shop (commonly known as "The O"), a restaurant in Pittsburgh, Pennsylvania
 Overstock.com, online retailer previously known as O.co
 Realty Income, American real estate investment trust (NYSE stock ticker O)

History
 O-class battlecruiser, class of German ships in the 1930s
 The O (political group) (The Organization), a 1970s American political group

Linguistics
 O, an antiquated vocative placed before a name of, or phrase characterizing, the party being addressed
 O (also P), the patient-like argument (object) of a canonical transitive verb
O, gender neutral third person pronoun in the Turkish language
 O-, an honorific prefix used in the Japanese language

Mathematics
 , a Bachmann–Landau notation in computational complexity theory ("|f| is bounded above by g asymptotically")
 , a Bachmann–Landau notation in computational complexity theory ("f is dominated by g asymptotically")
 O, for orthogonal group
 ∘ indicates function composition, or composition of morphisms in a category
 o, for octet, an information measure unit used in computing

Media
 O, an IRC operator service in QuakeNet's IRC services

Places
 O Brook, a short river in Devon, England

Science 
 Oxygen, symbol O, a chemical element
 O, a human blood type, the universal donor
 Haplogroup O (Y-DNA), a Y-chromosomal DNA haplogroup
 O, for pyrrolysine an alpha amino acid in biochemistry
 Class O, stellar classification for very hot bluish stars
 O (for Octavius, meaning an eight of a gallon), an apothecary's symbol for a pint

Surname
 O (surname), Korean surname romanized "O" or "Oh"
 Ō (Japanese surname), Japanese surname derived from the Chinese surname Wang (王)
 Ou (surname), Chinese and Cantonese surnames pronounced "O" or "Oh"
 A prefix meaning "grandson (of)", appearing in Irish surnames
 Genovevo de la O (1876-1952), Mexican revolutionary
 Karen O, born Karen Lee Orzolek, American singer

Other uses
 Oreo O's, an American breakfast cereal available internationally
 Oscar, the military time zone code for UTC−02:00: List of military time zones#O

See also

 
 Mr. O (TV show)
 Circle (disambiguation)
 Circle symbol (disambiguation)
 Zero (disambiguation)
 Big O (disambiguation)
 Omicron (disambiguation) including Ο/ο